Conospermum unilaterale is a shrub endemic to Western Australia.

It blooms between August and October producing white flowers.

It is found on plains and undulating hills along the west coast in the Wheatbelt region of Western Australia between Irwin and Dandaragan where it grows in sandy soils.

References

External links

Eudicots of Western Australia
unilaterale
Endemic flora of Western Australia
Plants described in 1995